Commandment Keeper Church, Beaufort South Carolina, May 1940 is a 1940 short documentary film which shows religious services taking place in a South Carolina Gullah community.

The documentary film was directed by Zora Neale Hurston.

In 2005, Commandment Keeper Church was selected for the United States National Film Registry by the Library of Congress as being "culturally, historically, or aesthetically significant".

References

External links 
Commandment Keeper Church essay by Fayth M. Parks at National Film Registry  
Commandment Keeper Church essay by Daniel Eagan in America's Film Legacy: The Authoritative Guide to the Landmark Movies in the National Film Registry, A&C Black, 2010 , pages 315-316 

1940 films
American short documentary films
United States National Film Registry films
1940s short documentary films
1940 documentary films
Black-and-white documentary films
American black-and-white films
Documentary films about South Carolina
Christianity in South Carolina
May 1940 events
1940 in South Carolina
Gullah culture
Beaufort, South Carolina
Works by Zora Neale Hurston
1940s American films